The 2008 West Lancashire District Council election took place on 1 May 2008 to elect members of  West Lancashire District Council in Lancashire, England. One third of the council was up for election and the Conservative party stayed in overall control of the council.

After the election, the composition of the council was:

Campaign
Before the election, in which 19 seats were being contested, the Conservatives ran the council with 33 of the 52 seats. The seat in Tanhouse was being contested after the death of Labour councillor Sally Keegan in December 2007, while Conservative Martin Forshaw was unopposed in Hesketh with Becconsall. The Conservatives were strongly favoured to remain in control and were particularly targeting the last Labour held seat in Burscough.

The Conservatives campaigned on plans to regenerate Skelmersdale, build new council offices on a site in Ormskirk and a pledge to keep council tax rises as low as possible.

Election result
The results saw the Conservatives increase their control of the council after making 2 gains from Labour. They gained the seats of Burscough West and Up Holland, with the margin of victory in Up Holland being only 3 votes after 2 recounts were required. Labour also only held the Tanhouse seat by 34 votes after a recount. The results meant the Conservatives had 35 seats compared to 18 for Labour and 1 independent. Overall turnout in the election was 30.51%.

The Conservative council leader, Geoff Roberts, saw the results as a sign they could take the parliamentary seat in the next general election, while Labour blamed their defeats on national issues.

Ward results

Ashurst

Aughton and Downholland

Birch Green

Burscough East

Burscough West

Derby

Digmoor

Halsall

Hesketh-with-Becconsall

Knowsley

Moorside

Rufford

Scott

Skelmersdale North

Skelmersdale South

Tanhouse

Tarleton

Up Holland

Wrightington

References

External links
Reactions to the results from the group leaders

2008 English local elections
2008
2000s in Lancashire